Maj Lillemor "Lill" Lindfors (born 12 May 1940) is a Swedish singer who has performed in Scandinavia since the 1960s.

Career
Lindfors was born into a Swedish-speaking Finnish family in Helsinki, Finland, and she moved to Sweden with her family when she was eight years old. She made her debut as a revue actress in Uddevalla in 1960. The following year she made her first recording. In the most recent decades, Lindfors has been known in Scandinavia for her "one-woman shows" in which she mixes music with a lot of comedy. She was one of the first artists who sang samba in Sweden, and she was also one of the first Swedish performers who did stand-up comedy in her shows.

Eurovision Song Contest
Lindfors's performance of "Nygammal Vals" ("New, yet familiar waltz")  with Svante Thuresson took second place in the 1966 Eurovision Song Contest.

She was the presenter of the 1985 Eurovision Song Contest in Gothenburg, Sweden, and was most famous for having a wardrobe malfunction live, during the contest, after passing through a part of the elaborate set. She later admitted it was a gag, but that it had not been rehearsed beforehand. The EBU was reportedly not pleased with the stunt. It remains one of the most iconic moments in the contest's history. She also performed "Musik ska byggas utav glädje" ("My Joy Is Building Bricks of Music") as the contest's major opener.

Others
She has starred in several Swedish TV shows which have won awards in Montreux.

In 1998, she became Sweden's Goodwill Ambassador to UNICEF.

Personal life
Lindfors lives in Stockholm, Sweden. She married director Peter Wester in 1969 and they had a daughter Petronella. They were divorced in 1974. She was then in relationship with the actor Brasse Brännström from 1974 to 1984. Since 1991 she has been married to the director Anders Byström.

Discography

Albums
1964: Adam och Eva (with Owe Thörnqvist)
1967: Påsen (with Anders Linder)
1967: Du är den ende
1968: Kom i min värld
1970: Albin & Greta (with Svante Thuresson)
1970: Vi har varann
1970: Mellan dröm och verklighet
1971: Sång
1973: Kom igen!

Singles
(Selective)
1966: "Du är den ende" ("Romance")
1967: "En sån karl" ("Just Like a Man")
1967: "Hör min samba"
1968: "En man i byrån" ("If You Can Put That in a Bottle")
1968: "Teresa"
1969: "Mellan dröm och verklighet"
1970: "Axel Öhman" (duet with Svante Thuresson)
1973: "Månskugga"
1973: "Sången han sjöng var min egen" ("Killing Me Softly with His Song")
1978: "Om du nånsin kommer fram till Samarkand"
1978: "Tillsammans är ett sätt att finnas till"
1984: "Marias första dans"

See also
 List of Eurovision Song Contest presenters

References

External links

Eurovision 1966 Information
Eurovision 1985 Information
Ms. Lindfors's official website

1940 births
Living people
Eurovision Song Contest entrants of 1966
Finnish emigrants to Sweden
20th-century Finnish women singers
Melodifestivalen contestants
Melodifestivalen winners
Singers from Helsinki
Eurovision Song Contest entrants for Sweden
20th-century Swedish women singers
Swedish-language singers
Swedish-speaking Finns